[[File:Elimaea fallax.png|thumb|[[Elimaea fallax|Elimaea (Elimaea) fallax]]]]Elimaea is a large genus within Tettigoniidae, the bush cricket or katydid family. Species in this genus are found in India, southern China, Indo-China and Malesia.

The genus was erected in 1874 by Swedish entomologist Carl Stål (1833–1878) in his Recensio Orthopterorum. With over 130 described species, it is the most speciose and widespread genus within the tribe Elimaeini (subfamily Phaneropterinae).

 Species 
This genus has nine subgenera and one species group:

Subgenus Bornelimaea Gorochov, 2009
 Elimaea levi Gorochov, 2009
 Elimaea sympatrica Gorochov, 2009

Subgenus Elimaea Stål, 1874
 

Subgenus Neoelimaea Gorochov, 2013
 Elimaea melanocantha (Walker, 1869)
 Elimaea nigrosignata Bolívar, 1900

Subgenus Poaefoliana Ingrisch, 2011
 Elimaea albimaculata Ingrisch, 2011
 Elimaea emlobata Wang & Shi, 2017
 Elimaea jitra Ingrisch, 2011
 Elimaea kutu Ingrisch, 2011
 Elimaea upcurva Liu, 2011
 Species group Elimaea poaefolia (Haan, 1843) – Malesia
 Elimaea jacobsonii Karny, 1926
 Elimaea poaefolia (Haan, 1843)
 Elimaea rosea Brunner von Wattenwyl, 1878

Subgenus Pseudectadia Gorochov, 2009
 Elimaea grata Gorochov, 2009
 Elimaea sonora Gorochov, 2009

Subgenus Rectielimaea Liu, 2011
 Elimaea percauda Liu & Liu, 2011

Subgenus Rhaebelimaea Karny, 1926

Subgenus Schizelimaea Gorochov, 2009

Subgenus Sulawimaea Gorochov, 2013
 Elimaea inversa (Brunner von Wattenwyl, 1891)
 Elimaea sulawesi (Gorochov, 2009)

Subgenus not allocated
 Elimaea bidentata Brunner von Wattenwyl, 1878
 Elimaea furca Gorochov, 2013
 Elimaea grandis (Matsumura & Shiraki, 1908)
 Elimaea storozhenkoi Gorochov, 2013
 Elimaea yaeyamensis Ichikawa, 2004

 References 

External links
 Kim T, Pham HT (2014) Checklist of Vietnamese Orthoptera Saltatoria Zootaxa'' 3811 (1): 53–82.

 
Tettigoniidae genera
Orthoptera of Indo-China